Loïck Peyron (born 1 December 1959 in Nantes) is a French yachtsman, younger brother of the yachtsman Bruno Peyron.

He is particularly famous for winning many races in the 1990s on board his trimaran Fujicolor.

Among his notable achievements, he won the ORMA Championship four times in 1996, 1997, 1999 and 2002, the STAR transatlantic race three times, the transat Jacques Vabre twice and won the Jules Verne Trophy in 2012.

After Benjamin de Rothschild gave him control of the Gitana Team in April 2006, the team built Gitana Eighty, a 60 feet monohull, launched in July 2007 with which Loick Peyron won the Transat. On 9 December 2008, he began his participation in the 2008-2009 Vendée Globe with Gitana Eighty. After having led the race for 16 days, Gitana Eighty'''s mast broke.

In 2010, Peyron sailed in the 33rd America's Cup as part of the Alinghi Team, in the roles of 'floater' in race 1 and relief helmsman in race 2. Alinghi were defeated by the American challenger BMW Oracle Racing. In early 2012 he won the Jules Verne Trophy in a time of  45 days 13 hours 42 minutes 53 seconds, breaking Franck Cammas previous record by 2 days.

In late 2012 he was asked to join Artemis Racing, Challenger of Record for the 34th America's Cup, as one of the helmsmen. He brings a great amount of knowledge and expertise of multihulls to the campaign.

In November 2014, he won the Route du Rhum single-handed transat on Banque Populaire VII maxi trimaran. He set the new record, travelling from Brittany to Guadeloupe in 7 days 15 hours 8 minutes and 32 seconds (22.93 kts average speed) and beating Lionel Lemonchois 2006 record by 2h 10mn 34s.

In May 2016, he entered the Single-Handed Trans-Atlantic Race aboard Pen Duick II, the boat sailed by Éric Tabarly to win this very race in 1964.

 Achievements Loïck Peyron on the Vendée Globe website 
 2014
 Route du Rhum transat : Winner on Banque Populaire VII maxi trimaran. And record of the race.
 2012
 Jules Verne Trophy on Banque Populaire V in 45 days 13 hours 42 minutes 53 seconds.
 2011
 Round the British Isles outright record on Banque Populaire V in 3 days, 3 hours and 49 minutes.
 Fastnet race: outright record on Banque Populaire V in 1 day 8 hours 48 minutes and 46 seconds.
 Record SNSM : Winner on the multihull Banque Populaire V
 Barcelona World Race : Winner on Virbac-Paprec 3 with Jean-Pierre Dick
 2009
 Challenge Julius Baer : Winner on Okalys (D35)
 2008
 Record SNSM : Winner on the monohull Gitana Eighty the Artemis Transat  : Winner on Gitana Eighty.
 Spi Ouest France : Winner on Domaine du Mont d'Arbois.
 2007
 Transat Ecover BtoB : Winner on the monohull Gitana Eighty Transat Jacques Vabre : 8th on Gitana Eighty with Jean-Baptiste Levaillant
 Bol d'Or du Léman : Winner on Okalys (D35)
 2006
 Challenge Julius Baer : Winner on Okalys (D35)
 2005
 Bol d'Or du Léman : Winner on Okalys (D35)
 Challenge Julius Baer : Winner on Okalys (D35)
 Transat Jacques Vabre  : Winner together with Jean-Pierre Dick on the monohull Virbac-Paprec Route des Iles à la voile : Winner with Dimitri Deruelle
 Trophée Clairefontaine : Winner
 2003
 Transat Jacques Vabre : 2nd with Jean-Luc Nélias on Belgacom Solitaire du Figaro : 6th
 2002
 Trophée Clairefontaine : Winner
 2001
 Transat Jacques Vabre : 3rd on trimaran Fujifilm The Race : 2nd on catamaran Innovation Explorer. He broke the 24 hours distance record.
 1999
 Trophée Clairefontaine : Winner
 Transat Jacques Vabre : 1st on the trimaran Fujicolor II, with Franck Proffit
 Course de l'Europe : 1st on trimaran Fujicolor II 1998
 Trophée Clairefontaine : Winner
 Route du Rhum : 5th on Fujicolor II Course de Phares : Winner on Fujicolor II 1997
 Trophée Clairefontaine : Winner
 Course de l'Europe  : Winner on Fujicolor II Transat Jacques Vabre : 3rd on Fujicolor II 1996
 The Europe 1 Star (Transat) : Winner on Fujicolor II Trophée Clairefontaine : Winner
 Transat Québec-Saint-Malo : Winner on Fujicolor II Grand prix de Fécamp : Winner on Fujicolor II 1995
 Trophée Clairefontaine : Winner
 Course de l'Europe  : Winner on Fujicolor II Grand prix de Fécamp : Winner on Fujicolor II Grand prix de Saint Nazaire : Winner on Fujicolor II 1994
 Trophée des Multicoques : Winner on Fujicolor II Twostar : 2nd on Fujicolor II 1993
 Trophée des Multicoques : Winner on Fujicolor II Transat Jacques Vabre : 3rd monohull on Fujicolor III Course de l'Europe : Winner on Fujicolor II 1992
 The Europe 1 Star (Transat) : Winner on Fujicolor 1990
 Vendée Globe : 2nd on Lada Poch III 1989
 Lorient Saint Bathélemy Lorient : Winner in the monohull category.
 1988
 Transat Québec-Saint-Malo : 2nd on Lada Poch II The CSTAR (Transat) : 3rd on Lada Poch II 1987
 La Baule-Dakar : Winner on Lada Poch II with Jacques Delorme
 GP de Boulogne (Formule 40) : 4th on Lada Poch 1986
 Route du Rhum : 5th on Lada Poch I Solitaire du Figaro : 4th on Lada Poch 1985
 Course de l'Europe : Winner on Lada Poch I (Class III)
 1984
 Transat Québec-Saint-Malo : 5th, teammate of Mike Birch, on the catamaran Formule Tag 1983
 La Baule-Dakar : 4th on Lada Poch I Lorient — Les Bermudes — Lorient  : 5th on Transat TAG Québec
 1982
 Route du Rhum : 17th on La Baule-Teletota
 La Rochelle - New-Orleans : 9th with Bruno Peyron on Jaz 1981
 La Baule-Dakar : 21st on Acoustique HRC 1980
 Solitaire du Figaro : Winner of the 4th stage
 1979
 Mini Transat : 26th on Sogeport-Alcor''

References

External links  
 
 
 

French male sailors (sport)
1959 births
Living people
1989 Vendee Globe sailors
1992 Vendee Globe sailors
2008 Vendee Globe sailors
French Vendee Globe sailors
Vendée Globe finishers
Single-handed circumnavigating sailors
IMOCA 60 class sailors
Alinghi sailors
Energy Team sailors
Artemis Racing sailors
2010 America's Cup sailors
2013 America's Cup sailors
Extreme Sailing Series sailors